Mithi Rohar or Rohar is a village in Gandhidham Taluka of Kutch district of Gujarat, India.

History
Once the village was chief seaport of Anjar district. Now the town is surrounded by industries of Kandla Port.

References

 This article incorporates Public Domain text from 

Villages in Kutch district